"McGregor" is a song by Puerto Rican rapper and singer Anuel AA and was released on November 26, 2021. It was released as the sixth single from his album Las Leyendas Nunca Mueren. The song debuted at number 58 in Spain  and reached number 25 on the US Billboard Hot Latin Songs chart.

Background 
2 days before the release of the album Las Leyendas Nunca Mueren, Anuel AA uploaded the official preview of the sixth track, called McGregor.

Composition 
The song contains samples of "Drive Forever" performed by Sergio Valentino. Anuel AA mentions such artists as Daddy Yankee, Don Omar and even his ex-girlfriend Karol G. In the music video he censored Karol G's name.

Music video  
The music video of the song was released on March 4, 2022 and was directed by Fernando Lugo and Anuel AA. It was recorded in the Dominican Republic and shows fragments and recreates Conor McGregor's fights against José Aldo, Nate Diaz and Eddie Alvarez. In June the music video got removed due to copyright but it was recovered later.

References 

2021 songs
2021 singles
Anuel AA songs
Spanish-language songs